Bertold Popovics (born 21 June 1991) is a Hungarian midfielder who currently plays for Balassagyarmati VSE.

At age 20, Popovics signed a professional contract with Újpest in July 2011.

References

External links
 Player profile at HLSZ 

1991 births
Living people
Sportspeople from Szeged
Hungarian footballers
Association football midfielders
Tisza Volán SC footballers
Újpest FC players
Vasas SC players
Kisvárda FC players
Salgótarjáni BTC footballers
Ceglédi VSE footballers
Balassagyarmati SE footballers